Melvin Wayne Osmond (born August 28, 1951) is a retired American musician and singer. He is the second oldest of the original Osmond Brothers singers and the fourth oldest of the nine Osmond children.

Life and career 

Osmond was born in Ogden, Utah, the son of Olive May (née Davis; 1925–2004) and George Virl Osmond (1917–2007). Wayne has been performing since he was six years old. He made his national television debut on NBC's The Andy Williams Show, with brothers Alan, Merrill, and Jay. The four remained with Andy Williams for seven years.

Alan, Merrill, Jay, and Wayne Osmond were also cast in nine episodes of the 1963–1964 ABC Western series, The Travels of Jaimie McPheeters, with Wayne in the role of young Leviticus Kissel. The series is the story of a wagon train to the American West as seen from the eyes of 12-year-old Jaime McPheeters, played by Kurt Russell, with other roles for Dan O'Herlihy, Michael Witney, and Charles Bronson.

Mostly a lead-guitarist and singer, Wayne Osmond can also play the flute, clarinet, saxophone, violin, banjo, piano, drums, and bagpipes.

Wayne Osmond with brothers Merrill and Alan wrote many of the Osmonds' hit songs during the 1970s. He was the main driving force toward the group's move toward rock music, as opposed to the bubblegum pop that made the family famous.

Family 
On December 13, 1974, Wayne married Kathlyn White from Bountiful, Utah, a former Miss Davis County Fair (Davis County, Utah) and Miss Utah of 1974. Wayne and Kathlyn have five children, three daughters and two sons.
In the 1990s, Wayne moved to Branson, Missouri, where he performed and toured with his brothers at the Osmond Family Theater, Country Tonight, Moon River Theater, and Branson Variety Theater. 

In 1997, Wayne was diagnosed with a brain tumor which was successfully treated. He remains an avid aviation enthusiast. He has announced that because of health issues (including worsening hearing loss, a recurring problem in the Osmond family), he has retired and will no longer be appearing or performing with his family. His last intended appearance with them was October 13, 2018, although he made an additional appearance with his brothers a year later as a birthday present to their sister, Marie. 

Like the rest of his family, Wayne is a member of the Church of Jesus Christ of Latter-day Saints.

Discography

Studio albums 

 Osmonds (1970)
 Homemade (1971)
 Phase III (1972)
 Crazy Horses (1972)
 The Plan (1973)
 Love Me for a Reason (1974)
 The Proud One (1975)
 Brainstorm (1976)
 Osmond Christmas Album (1976)
 Steppin' Out (1979)

See also 
List of people with brain tumors

References

External links 
Wayne Osmond on Official Osmond Family website

1951 births
Living people
American banjoists
American clarinetists
American flautists
American Latter Day Saints
American male drummers
American male guitarists
American male pianists
American male pop singers
American male saxophonists
American male television actors
American multi-instrumentalists
American rock guitarists
American rock saxophonists
American pop rock singers
American rock pianists
American rock drummers
American rock singers
Guitarists from Los Angeles
Guitarists from Utah
Lead guitarists
Songwriters from California
Bagpipe players
Musicians from Ogden, Utah
People from Branson, Missouri
The Osmonds members
Osmond family (show business)
20th-century American drummers
20th-century American guitarists
20th-century American pianists
21st-century American pianists
21st-century clarinetists
21st-century American saxophonists
21st-century American violinists
20th-century American male musicians
21st-century American male musicians
20th-century flautists
21st-century flautists